Joanie Sommers (born Joan Drost, February 24, 1941) is an American singer and actress with a career concentrating on jazz, standards and popular material and show-business credits. Once billed as "The Voice of the Sixties", and associated with top-notch arrangers, songwriters and producers, Sommers' popular reputation became closely tied to her biggest, yet most uncharacteristic, hit song, "Johnny Get Angry".

Career
Born in Buffalo, New York, United States, Sommers began singing in church to deal with "a difficult childhood".  In 1951, aged 10, she appeared on a Buffalo television program singing Hank Williams' "Your Cheating Heart", winning an amateur talent contest. Throughout her youth, she lived with her father and 2 brothers in North Tonawanda, New York and attended school there until age 14.

In 1955, her family relocated to Venice, California, where she won honors as a vocalist with her high school band at Venice High, and did so again at Santa Monica City College.

Her break came after a friend took her to the Deauville Country Club (now Braemar Country Club) in Santa Monica, where she sang with Tommy Oliver's band. He arranged for a demo record to be cut and presented it to Warner Brothers, whereupon Sommers was signed to the label.

Warner initially used her vocal talents singing "Am I Blue" on a 1959 Warner specialty record, Behind Closed Doors at a Recording Session, and on one side of the spoken-word single "Kookie's Love Song" with Edd Byrnes. The pairing with Byrnes led to a small role in 77 Sunset Strip, the private detective television series featuring Byrnes in the role of Gerald Lloyd "Kookie" Kookson III. In addition, she sang on Byrnes' "I Don't Dig You" and "Hot Rod Rock" which appeared on one of his albums.

Concurrently, Oliver supported Sommers by starring her in his orchestra engagements at California venues Hollywood Palladium and The Chalet at Lake Arrowhead.

Her 1960 debut single "One Boy" (from the musical Bye Bye Birdie) charted for three months, peaking at number 54 on the Billboard Top 100. Both "One Boy" and the flip side "I'll Never Be Free" were Billboard Spotlight Winners. A subsequent touring schedule included venues such as New York's Left Bank Club, Hollywood's Crescendo, Freddie's in Minneapolis, and The Cloister in Chicago, and appearances on the Jack Paar Show and Bobby Darin Special.

In early 1960, Warner released Sommers' first LP, Positively the Most, which did not include the "One Boy" hit single. Later that year, Warner released the single "Ruby-Duby-Du", featuring a vocal version of the Tobin Mathews & Co. instrumental from the motion picture Key Witness. The record did not chart.

In 1962, Sommers' single "Johnny Get Angry", released on Warner Bros. Records, reached number 7 on the Billboard Hot 100. It was held from the top of the charts by such hit songs as "Roses Are Red (My Love)" by Bobby Vinton, "I Can't Stop Loving You" by Ray Charles, and "Sealed With A Kiss" by Brian Hyland. Sommers' song "When the Boys Get Together" charted at #94 later the same year.

In a 2001 interview, Sommers commented on the legacy of her greatest hit: "Twenty albums with some of the greatest names in jazz and I'm eternally linked to 'Johnny Get Angry'".

Her 1965 track, "Don't Pity Me" was a Northern Soul hit in the UK, often featured on Northern Soul top lists. The 45RPM record routinely changes hands among collectors at over $500 a copy. The flip side, "My Block", was written by Jimmy Radcliffe, Bert Berns and Carl Spencer. It had previously been recorded by Clyde McPhatter on his Songs Of the Big City album and by The Chiffons, recording as The Four Pennies, on Rust Records.

Throughout the 1960s and 1970s Sommers appeared on television as a singer and game show contestant, including shows such as Everybody's Talking, Hollywood Squares, You Don't Say, and The Match Game, as well as a performer on Dick Clark's Where the Action Is, Hullabaloo, and other variety shows.

In 1963, she appeared on the January 22 segment of The Jack Benny Program,  where she sang "I'll Never Stop Loving You"; another guest was actor Peter Lorre.

Her acting credits include Everything's Ducky (1961) opposite Mickey Rooney, and Jack Arnold's The Lively Set (1964), in which she sang "If You Love Him." In the last episode of The Wild Wild West, titled The Night of the Tycoons (April 11, 1969), she sang "Dreams, Dreams of a Lady's Love."

In a parallel career track of commercial vocal work, Sommers sang the jingles "Now It's Pepsi, For Those Who Think Young" (to the tune of Makin' Whoopee) and "Come Alive! You're in the Pepsi Generation" in radio and TV commercials. She came to be referred to as "The Pepsi Girl". Years later she sang the jingle "Now You See It, Now You Don't" for the sugar-free companion product, Diet Pepsi.

Sommers' voice work for animated films includes The Peppermint Choo Choo, which was scrubbed, although the music was released; Rankin/Bass' The Mouse on the Mayflower as Priscilla Mullins (1968); and B.C.: The First Thanksgiving (1973) in dual roles as the Fat Broad and the Cute Chick.

In the early 1970s, Sommers withdrew from show business to focus on family life. She began making public appearances again during the 1980s, including two on Santa Monica radio station KCRW's satirical program, The Cool & the Crazy, hosted by Art Fraud (Ronn Spencer) and Vic Tripp (Gene Sculatti).

In 2001, Sommers sang two songs on Abe Most's Camard album, I Love You Much Too Much. She performed the title track and "Bei Mir Bist du Schoen." She sang a chorus in Yiddish on both tracks.

In 2004 the Japan-only album release, Johnny Got Angry, consisted of all original tunes written by Sommers' friend and voice actor, Will Ryan.

Personal life
Sommers was married to theatrical agent Jerry Steiner from 1961 until his sudden death in 1972. Their three children are Carolyn, Nancy and Jason.

Singles discography

Album discography
1960: Positively the Most! Warner Bros. W1346
1961: The "Voice" of the 60's Warner Bros. W1412
1962: Look Out! It's Joanie Sommers (with Bobby Troup and Shelly Manne)
1962: For Those Who Think Young Warner Bros. W1436
1962: Johnny Get Angry Warner Bros. W1470
1962: Let's Talk About Love Warner Bros W1474
1963: Sommers' Seasons Warner Bros. WS1504
1964: Softly, the Brazilian Sound Warner Bros. WS1575
1965: Come Alive! Columbia CS 9295
1966: On the Flip Side – Original Cast Album (w/ Rick Nelson, cuts 2, 4 and 8) Decca 4824
1982: Dream Discovery Records DS-887
1988: Tangerine HiBrite PCB-203
1992: A Fine Romance HiBrite HTCP-10
1995: Hits and Rareties Marginal MAR-001
2000: Here, There and Everywhere! Absord ABCJ 313
2000: Johnny Got Angry Absord ABCJ 314
2001:  "I Love You Much Too Much"  Camard (not numbered)
2005: Sings Bossa Nova Absord ABCJ 339
2011: Complete Warner Bros. Singles Real Gone Music
2013: Come Alive The Complete Columbia Recordings Real Gone Music

References

External links
 "Sommers Is Icumen On" From the Dec. 15, 1961 issue of TIME magazine
 Jazz Times article 08/09/10 C. Loudon

American women singers
American people of Polish descent
Living people
1941 births
Musicians from Buffalo, New York
Musicians from Los Angeles
Venice High School (Los Angeles) alumni
Santa Monica College alumni
21st-century American women